Zdeněk Pecka (born 6 February 1954) is a Czech rower who competed for Czechoslovakia in the 1976 Summer Olympics and in the 1980 Summer Olympics.

He was born in Litoměřice. In 1976 he was a crew member of the Czechoslovak boat which won the bronze medal in the quadruple sculls event. Four years later he won his second bronze medal this time with his partner Václav Vochoska in the double sculls competition.

Pecka was the coach of Olympic silver medalist Václav Chalupa from 1989 to 2004. He is married to Květa Jeriová.

References

External links
 

1954 births
Living people
Czech male rowers
Czechoslovak male rowers
Olympic rowers of Czechoslovakia
Rowers at the 1976 Summer Olympics
Rowers at the 1980 Summer Olympics
Olympic bronze medalists for Czechoslovakia
Olympic medalists in rowing
World Rowing Championships medalists for Czechoslovakia
Medalists at the 1980 Summer Olympics
Medalists at the 1976 Summer Olympics
People from Litoměřice
Sportspeople from the Ústí nad Labem Region